Mexico competed at the 2016 Winter Youth Olympics in Lillehammer, Norway from 12 to 21 February 2016.

Competitors

Alpine skiing

Mexico qualified one girl.

Girls

Freestyle skiing

Mexico received a reallocated spot in the boys' ski cross event.

Ski cross

Snowboarding

Snowboard and ski cross relay

Qualification legend: FA – Qualify to medal round; FB – Qualify to consolation round

See also
Mexico at the 2016 Summer Olympics

References

Nations at the 2016 Winter Youth Olympics
Mexico at the Youth Olympics
2016 in Mexican sports